The Bishop of Ardfert and Aghadoe (usually simply referred to as the Bishop of Ardfert) was an episcopal title which took its name after the village of Ardfert and townland of Aghadoe, both in County Kerry, Republic of Ireland.

History
The diocese of Ráith Maighe Deiscirt was one of the twenty-four dioceses established at the Synod of Rathbreasail in 1111 and was co-extensive with the kingdom of Iarmuman; which consisted all of County Kerry and a small part of County Cork. The bishop's seat (Cathedra) was originally located at Rathass near Tralee, but by 1117, it had been moved to Ardfert Cathedral. At the Synod of Kells in 1152, the diocese lost some territory when the diocese of Scattery Island was established.

After the Reformation, there were parallel apostolic successions. In the Church of Ireland, the title continued until 1661 when it united with Limerick to form the bishopric of Limerick, Ardfert and
Aghadoe. The Roman Catholic Church title continued until 1952 when it changed its name to the bishopric of Kerry.

Pre-Reformation bishops

Post-Reformation bishops

Church of Ireland succession

Roman Catholic succession

References

External links
 GENUKI – Ardfert
 GENUKI – Aghadoe

Ardfert and Aghadoe
Roman Catholic Diocese of Kerry
Ardfert and Aghadoe
Bishops of Limerick or Ardfert or of Aghadoe
Former Roman Catholic bishoprics in Ireland
 Bishops